Edward Francis McGinley Jr. (August 9, 1899 – April 16, 1985) was an American football player and coach. He played college football as a tackle at the University of Pennsylvania and professionally for one season, in 1925, with the New York Giants of the National Football League (NFL). McGinley also served as the head football coach at Saint Joseph's College—now known as Saint Joseph's University—in Philadelphia in 1925. He was inducted into the College Football Hall of Fame as a player in 1979.

Head coaching record

References

External links
 
 

1899 births
1985 deaths
American football tackles
New York Giants players
Penn Quakers football players
Saint Joseph's Hawks football coaches
All-American college football players
College Football Hall of Fame inductees
People from Delaware County, Pennsylvania
Coaches of American football from Pennsylvania
Players of American football from Pennsylvania